Madeleine Akrich (born March 4, 1959) is a French sociologist of technology. She served as the director of the Center for the Sociology of Innovation at Mines ParisTech from 2003 to 2013.

Research 
Akrich's work concerns the sociology of technology. She developed actor–network theory, a theoretical approach to social analysis, alongside Michel Callon, Bruno Latour, John Law, and others. 

Akrich primarily studies users' relationships with various technologies, with a focus on technologies of obstetric medicine and, in recent collaboration with Cécile Méadel, online health discussion forums.

In 2016, Akrich received the CNRS Silver Medal.

Notable publications 

  Madeleine Akrich, Cécile Méadel and Vololona Rabeharisoa, Se mobiliser pour la santé. Des associations s'expriment, Paris, Presses des mines, 2009.
 Madeleine Akrich & Cécile Méadel, "De l'interaction à l'engagement: les collectifs électroniques, nouveaux militants dans le champ de la santé," Hermès, n°47, 2007.
 Madeleine Akrich, Bruno Latour, & Michel Callon (ed.), Sociologie de la traduction : textes fondateurs, Paris, Mines Paris, les Presses, "Sciences sociales," 2006. 
 Madeleine Akrich, Vololona Rabeharisoa, P. Jamet, Cécile Méadel & F. Vincent (ed.), La Griffe de l'ours. Débats et controverses en environnement, Paris, Presses de l'École des Mines, 2002.
 Madeleine Akrich & Françoise Laborie, De la contraception à l'enfantement. L'offre technologique en question, Paris ; Montréal (Québec), l'Harmattan, 1999. 
 Madeleine Akrich & Bernike Pasveer, Comment la naissance vient aux femmes. Les techniques de l'accouchement en France et aux Pays-Bas, Le Plessis-Robinson, Synthélabo, "Les Empêcheurs de penser en rond," 1996. 
 Madeleine Akrich,  L. Bibard, Michel Callon et al. (ed.), Ces réseaux que la raison ignore, Paris, l'Harmattan, "Logiques sociales," 1992.  
 Madeleine Akrich, "The De-Scription of Technical Objects" in Shaping Technology / Building Society: Studies in Sociotechnical Change, 1992.

References

External links 
 Research page on CSI

French women sociologists
Science and technology studies scholars
Actor-network theory
Sociologists of science
Philosophers of technology
1959 births
People from Boulogne-Billancourt
Living people
Academic staff of Mines Paris - PSL